The New Providence Stakes, last run in 2018, was a Canadian Thoroughbred horse race run annually in mid May at Woodbine Racetrack in Toronto, Ontario. An Ontario Sire Stakes, it was a restricted race for horses aged three and older. A sprint race, it is competed over a distance of 6 furlongs on Polytrack synthetic dirt and currently carries a purse of $125,000.

Inaugurated in 1982, the race was named in honour of the Windfields Farm Canadian Horse Racing Hall of Fame colt New Providence who in 1959 became the first official winner of the Canadian Triple Crown.

Records
Speed  record: 
 1:08.77 - Paso Doble (2015)

Most wins:
 3 - Paso Doble (2011, 2013, 2015)

Most wins by an owner:
 3 - Kinghaven Farms (1984, 1986, 1987)

Most wins by a jockey:
 6 -Eurico Rosa Da Silva (2008,2009,2013,2015,2017,2018)

Most wins by a trainer:
 5 - Robert P. Tiller (1997, 2003, 2007, 2017, 2018)

Winners of the New Providence Stakes

References
 New Providence Stakes at Pedigree Query

Ontario Sire Stakes
Ungraded stakes races in Canada
Recurring sporting events established in 1982
Woodbine Racetrack